David Valdez may refer to:

 David Valdez (footballer) (born 1993), Argentine footballer
 David Valdez (photographer) (born 1949), American photographer